The men's sprint C-1 (canoe single) 1000 metres competition at the 2018 Asian Games was held on 30 August 2018.

Schedule
All times are Western Indonesia Time (UTC+07:00)

Results
Legend
DNF — Did not finish

References

External links
Official website

Men's C-1 1000 metres